Veena Kumari is Professor of Experimental Psychology at the Institute of Psychiatry, King's College London.

Selected publications

References

British women academics
Academics of King's College London
British psychologists
Living people
Year of birth missing (living people)